Ommatoiulus is a genus of millipedes in the family Julidae.

The taxonomy of the genus has had a complicated history. As it stands now, there are approximately 60 described species, but this is likely to change. At least 10 new species were described in 2012, and those just from Spain. Six new species were described from Portugal in 2017. There are many millipedes known to belong to this genus that do not yet have official names.

This genus is distinguished by the position of the ozopores, the shape of the ocelli and the gonopod legs, the presence of accessory claws on the juveniles, and the presence in males of a large fovea, a cavity where sperm are stored.

Familiar species include the black Portuguese millipede (Ommatoiulus moreletii). It is an invasive species in Australia known for its "plagues", when it emerges in swarms so massive that they stop trains, which crush them in huge numbers and make the rails slippery. Like some other millipedes, it produces a secretion with an obnoxious odor and tendency to stain floors when the swarms invade houses. Another well-known species is the striped millipede (O. sabulosus), which also swarms. In 2002 it flooded the streets of Dąbrowa Górnicza in Poland, "causing panic among the inhabitants". Swarms in France have consisted of "thousands of millions" of individuals, far too many to count. This species has also been known to stop trains.

Species include:

Ommatoiulus alacygni
Ommatoiulus andalusius
Ommatoiulus aurozonatus
Ommatoiulus avatar
Ommatoiulus baenai
Ommatoiulus baileyi
Ommatoiulus bipartitus
Ommatoiulus camurus
Ommatoiulus caspius
Ommatoiulus cingulatus
Ommatoiulus denticulatus
Ommatoiulus diplurus
Ommatoiulus dorsovittatus
Ommatoiulus fuentei
Ommatoiulus fuscounilineatus
Ommatoiulus hoffmani
Ommatoiulus ibericus
Ommatoiulus ilicis
Ommatoiulus inconspicuus
Ommatoiulus jaenensis
Ommatoiulus kessleri
Ommatoiulus kimei
Ommatoiulus lapidarius
Ommatoiulus litoralis
Ommatoiulus lusitanus
Ommatoiulus martensi
Ommatoiulus moreletii 
Ommatoiulus navasi
Ommatoiulus niger
Ommatoiulus oliveirae
Ommatoiulus oxypygus
Ommatoiulus paralellus
Ommatoiulus porathi
Ommatoiulus pseudoflagellatus
Ommatoiulus punicus
Ommatoiulus recueroi
Ommatoiulus reipi
Ommatoiulus rutilans
Ommatoiulus sabinarensis
Ommatoiulus sabulosus
Ommatoiulus schubarti
Ommatoiulus staglae
Ommatoiulus stellaris
Ommatoiulus tetuanus
Ommatoiulus vilnensis

References

Julida